The Smuggler's Bride of Mallorca (German: Die Schmugglerbraut von Mallorca) is a 1929 German silent romance film directed by Hans Behrendt and starring Jenny Jugo, Friedrich Benfer and Clifford McLaglen. It was shot at the Babelsberg Studios in Berlin. It premiered in the city's UFA-Palast am Zoo .

Cast
 Jenny Jugo as Rosita 
 Friedrich Benfer as Pedro, Fischer  
 Clifford McLaglen as Andrea, Fischer 
 Raimondo Van Riel as Tolomeo 
 Félix de Pomés as Polizeileutnant de Roya 
 Jutta Jol as Manuela 
 Mikhail Rasumny as Taschendieb Cambero 
 Hans Sternberg as Wirt vom 'Schwarzen Skorpion'

Bibliography
 Bergfelder, Tim & Bock, Hans-Michael. ''The Concise Cinegraph: Encyclopedia of German. Berghahn Books, 2009.

External links

1929 films
Films of the Weimar Republic
German silent feature films
German romance films
Films directed by Hans Behrendt
Films set in Spain
Films set in the Mediterranean Sea
Films set on islands
UFA GmbH films
German black-and-white films
1929 romance films
Films shot at Babelsberg Studios
1920s German films